Logroño is a town in Morona-Santiago Province, Ecuador. It is the seat of Logroño Canton. It has a population of 5,723, the majority of which are Shuar. There is a network of limestone caves 2 km from the town, "Caverna de Las Cascadas".

History

Logroño has been inhabited for over 500 years by the Shuar. In 1930, the first to explore the area were missionaries who traveled down from the highlands of Ecuador (Azuay and Canar). The first evangelical missionary settlements were located south of Logrono (in Chupiankas) and the first catholic missionaries were located in the town center of Logroño. Due to its geographic location and economic assets, Logroño began its intent to become a canton on 14 October 1992, and official canton and political status were recognized on 22 January 1997.
Yaupi, a sector located within canton Logroño has its own governor in the area of 'Cordillera de Kutukú'.

The first mayor of Logroño was Jorge Enriquez (1997-2001), born in Quito, Ecuador and raised in canton Logroño, the second Angel Moises Molina (2001-2005) from near-by town, El Tesoro, the third Gregorio Unkuch (2005-2009) from Yaupi, and fourth Galo Utitiaj from Shimpis (2009-2013).

Local Culture

About 70% of the population of canton Logroño is nationality Shuar, and the remaining 30% is made up a 'mestizos' or of mixed origin. Both the Shuar and mestizo cultures are visible throughout canton Logroño in the local food, dance and customs. 

90% of Shuar live in the sectors of Yaupi and Shimpis, and 10% live in the sector of Logroño. In the Shuar culture it is common to have many children, and for men to have more than one wife. Shuar live either a communal or solitary lifestyle. The men are responsible for fishing and hunting, their sons are responsible for tending to the gardens and constructing houses, while the women cook for the house, weave crafts, and collect wild edible plants.

The traditional 'mestizo' cuisine includes roast guinea pig, chicken, a variety of soups, roasted and baked pork, local fish (Huambi, Cat Fish, Boca Chicas, Cachama etc.), or beef, all of which are all accompanied by rice and cassava, plantain, sweet potato, chonta, or other fruits and vegetables grown locally.

The main staple of the Shuar diet is 'chicha de yuca' (nijiamanch), and traditional food includes ayampacos which includes grubs, fish, or chicken wrapped in leaves and cooked over an open fire, and grilled wild game (armadillo, guanta, guatusa etc.), accompanied by cassava, plantains, papa china, sweet potato, or local plants from the jungle (col del monte, yuyo, wanchup, taro etc.) and local fruits (papaya, pineapple, mome, zapote etc.).

The celebrations of the canton of Logroño are 16–22 January. Throughout the week there are traditional dances, exhibition of local arts, agriculture fair, rodeo, traditional foods, beauty pageants, and a lot of dancing. 

Other cultural events include:
March 21-  Logroño limpio, compromiso de todos, a day dedicated to caring for the environment
June- Fiesta de la Chonta, the celebration of a local palm fruit.
June 29- Fiesta Patronal de San Pedro, a Christian religious holiday.
July 25-29-  Fiestas de Shimpis, the celebration of Shuar community, Shimpis
August 19- Fiestas de Yaupi, the celebration of Shuar community, Yaupi
November 3- Day of the Dead, which includes drinking the traditional colada morada and visiting those passed at the cemetery of Logroño.

Points of Interest

Canton Logroño is filled with caves, waterfalls, lakes, rivers and hot springs, and it's a great place to get to know the Shuar culture. It is highly recommended to enter Shuar communities ALWAYS with a local guide that is well known in the community.

Caverna de las Cascadas,  an intricate system of waterfall-filled caves located 10 minutes from the center of Logroño alongside of the Rio Upano (Upano River). You can easy spend a full or half day exploring the caves and camp out on the river side or stay in one of the hostels in Logroño.

Hot Springs of Logroño,  located about 30 minutes outside of Logroño exist these natural hot springs alongside of the Rio Upano (Upano River) next to a small sandy beach, a great place to relax for a couple of hours.

Cascada Chumpiankas,  a series of waterfalls surrounded by slanted rocks, the largest being 30 feet, outside of the Chupiankas Shuar community. To hike the waterfalls it is about a 5-minute taxi ride from Logroño and a 1-4 hour hike to the waterfalls. The Shuar community also sells traditional foods (ayampacos)and if your lucky some chicha (see below).

Chupiankas Shuar Community, here you have the opportunity to get to know the real Shuar in its pure state- with all of their customs, traditions, ceremonies, ancient stories told by the community, their grandfathers, and the founders of the community. Within the community also exists “Taramak” and “Yawi”, two local groups of Shuar woman who work to conserve their cultural and ancestral traditions. They make and sell traditional Shuar bracelets, necklaces, belts, crowns and other crafts made from locally sourced seeds, feathers and other natural  materials.

Laguna de Kumpak,  Carlos Shiki offers 3-4 day tours from Macas and Logroño. Travel to the Laguna includes 3 hours in car or bus through jungle terrain south of Logroño, a 2-hour canoe ride on río Yaupi passing by Shuar communities and a 1-hour hike from the river to the lake (including crossing a river in a cable car). When you arrive at the lake Carlos Shiki has traditional Shuar houses where tourists can stay, serves local food (ayampacos etc.), offers tours of the lake which has piranhas and crocodiles, and offers jungle hikes around the area through primary forest and to a natural river 'tobaggon'. In order to travel to the Laguna, contact the Municipio de Logroño a week in advance, or a travel agency in Macas. 

Comuna Grande,  a series of traditional Shuar huts located 30 minutes outside of Logroño alongside of the river Unumkis, here they serve typical foods and beverages surrounded by natural forest and near-by a swimming hole.

Rio Upano,  this crystal clear river runs from the sierra to the depths of the Amazon.   The river is mainly used locally for fishing, there is also rafting and kayaking offered out of Macas (class III-V). The Rio Upano is known for its fossils, sandy beaches  and many hot springs. There are numerous river overlooks including one a block from the central park of Logroño. There is also a cable car that crosses the river outside of Logroño across from Shuar Community- “La Union”.

Parque de Logroño, the park located in the center of Logroño, it is considered one of the best of the province, filled with a diversity of flowers, plants, and trees.

References

http://logronoturismo.com/

Populated places in Morona-Santiago Province